George Dearnaley (born 23 February 1969) is a retired South African football (soccer) striker who played for Hellenic FC, Seven Stars and most notably AmaZulu.

International career
He represented Bafana Bafana in the 1994 World Cup qualifiers. He made his international debut in a Group D World Cup qualifying where South Africa beat Congo 1–0 on 24 October 1992. He played his last international match in a Group D World Cup qualifying where South Africa beat Congo 1–0 on 31 January 1993.

Early life
Dearnaley is of English descent. His ancestors were probably from Dearnley in Lancashire. Dearnaley attended the New Forest Boys High School in Durban. Growing up in Montclair he had very easy access to NSL matches and venues in the townships. He would watch matches mainly from the Glebe Stadium in Umlazi where he encountered the likes of Mlungisi Ngubane and Jomo Sono on numerous occasions.

Amazulu
He got permission from Bizzah Dlamini to train with Usuthu in 1986 when Dearnaley was still in school. He left South Africa for a soccer scholarship in America after he saw minimal chances of playing professionally there, he returned after his father had a conversion with Clive Barker two weeks later. He attended first team pre season training with Amazulu in 1990 when he attended the Natal Technikon. He scored the second goal on debut in January 1990 against Fairway Stars at Kings Park Stadium in Durban winning 3-0. He went on to be the 1992 NSL Golden Boot winner with 20 league goals. He was nicknamed "Sgebengu" by Amazulu fans which means "criminal" in Zulu.

Professional experience after retirement
1997 – Associate Publisher at Touchline Media
1997–2007 – Associate Publisher at Kick Off Magazine
2006–2010 – Football consultant and columnist at 24.com
2008–2010 – Soccer Business Manager at Media24

Old Mutual FC
Dearnaley bought his own SAFA Second Division franchise, Old Mutual FC where he works with Gerald Stober and Mark Anderson as the goalkeeper coach.

References

External links

1969 births
Living people
South African soccer players
South Africa international soccer players
AmaZulu F.C. players
Hellenic F.C. players
White South African people
Sportspeople from Cape Town
South African people of English descent
Association football forwards